The Southwest Bypass and Southeast Bypass are two separately-constructed contiguous roads in the city of Greater Sudbury, in the Canadian province of Ontario, which form a bypass around the southern end of the city's urban core for traffic travelling on Highway 17, a portion of the Trans-Canada Highway. Most of the route is a Super two road with at-grade intersections, with the exception of short section of divided freeway at an interchange with Highway 69. Along with the Northwest Bypass from Lively to Chelmsford, the roads form a partial ring road around the city's urban core.

Although proposed as early as 1967, construction of the Southwest Bypass, connecting Highway17 near Lively with Highway69 south of Sudbury, didn't began until mid-1973. It opened as a two-lane route in late 1974, with no interchanges along its length. A four-lane bypass of Highway17 between Lively and Whitefish was built between 1976 and late 1980, connecting to the Southwest Bypass at a new interchange with what is now known as Sudbury Municipal Road 55. Construction of the Southeast Bypass, connecting Highway69 with Highway17 west of Coniston, began in 1992 and was opened on November9, 1994. Since then, while numerous proposals and studies have been undertaken on widening the route to a full freeway, only an interchange with Sudbury Municipal Road80 (Long Lake Road) has been built, opening in 2008.

Route description 

The Southwest Bypasses begin at an interchange with Sudbury Municipal Road55, with Highway17 continuing west towards Whitefish beyond the interchange. The four lane divided freeway immediately narrows to a two-lane road as it makes a broad turn from the southeast to the northeast and crosses Junction Creek.
A 100-metre right of way was designated in the 1970s for expansion of the Southwest Bypass to four lanes at a future date.
The route intersects Fielding Road north of the community of Mikkola as it continues curving northeast. It passes Fielding Memorial Park and bird sanctuary before travelling alongside the south shore of Kelly Lake. It makes another broad turn to the southwest, intersecting Southview Drive midway through the curve.

After intersecting Hannah Lake Road and Middle Lake Road, with views of their respective lakes nearby, the Southwest Bypass makes another broad curve to the east and then back southeast to avoid Silver Lake. It meets Sudbury Municipal Road80 (Long Lake Road) at an interchange, then turns east to travel along the southern edge of urban Sudbury. Curving northeast, the route briefly widens to four lanes at an interchange with Highway69, which also serves as the dividing point of the Southwest Bypass and the Southeast Bypass. It meets no roads for its entire length, although the highway crosses above Municipal Road67 (Bancroft Drive/Allan Street) as well as Armstrong Road at the Ottawa Valley Railway. Traffic on Highway 17 must turn right to continue on the highway.

History 

Prior to the construction of the bypasses, Highway17 followed what is now Municipal Road 55 (Lorne Street) into Sudbury from the west, while Highway69 followed what is now Municipal Road46 (Regent Street) into the city from the south. The two intersected and became concurrent along Lorne Street into the downtown. The paired highways turned east onto Elm Street, with Highway69 splitting north onto Notre Dame Avenue (Municipal Road80) at a location now occupied by the Rainbow Centre Mall. Highway17 continued east along Lloyd Street and Kingsway towards Conniston.

A bypass of Sudbury was first considered in the 1967 "Planning Study for the Sudbury Southwest By-Pass" which concluded that a four-lane highway around Sudbury was required in the near future. Following the completion of the "Sudbury-North Bay Area Highway Planning Study" in 1973, construction of the  Southwest Bypass began by mid-year.
The two-lane route, connecting Highway17 near Lively with Highway69 south of urban Sudbury, was opened ceremoniously by the Highways minister on October11, 1974. The project cost C$3.9 million ($ in  dollars).
It was considered part of the provincial highway system with the unposted number of Highway7153.

Further highway needs studies were conducted along the entire Sudbury–Sault Ste. Marie corridor to identify a future four-lane corridor in 1974 and 1975.
One of the first projects to begin following these studies was a  four-lane bypass of Highway17 between Lively and west of Whitefish, on which construction started in 1976.
The new route—connecting with the western end of the Southwest Bypass—was completed and opened to traffic on December4, 1980, at a total cost of $30million ($ in  dollars).

Construction of the Southeast Bypass, including an interchange at Highway69 to avoid interruptions during future four-laning, began in July 1992.
The two-lane route was opened on November9, 1994.
Work began to convert the signalised intersection at Long Lake Road with a grade-separated interchange in June 2007.
The new interchange was opened in December 2008.

Future 
The provincial government previously announced that the road would be converted to a freeway in the 2010s, around the same time that Highway 400 supersedes Highway 69 to Sudbury, although as of 2022 no firm date has been announced for commencement of construction. The Ministry of Transportation prepared and published its preferred plan for the southwest segment in the 2000s; planning on the southeast segment, from Highway 69 to Coniston with a potential further extension to Markstay, began in fall 2010. A preliminary four-lane plan for the southeast segment, as well as a new connection to Highway 69, was prepared in 1987 as part of the original route plan; however, due to a number of changes in the area, including the four-lane realignment of Highway 69 and the creation of Daisy Lake Uplands Provincial Park, modifications were needed to the final route plan.

In the Ministry of Transportation's current freeway conversion proposals for the bypass, access will be eliminated at all at-grade intersections. The plan has been criticized by Greater Sudbury City Councillor Terry Kett, due to the potential for an increased volume of traffic — particularly trucking traffic from the Walden Industrial Park on Fielding Road — spilling into the Mikkola subdivision.

Exit list

References

External links 

Roads in Greater Sudbury
Urban segments of the Trans-Canada Highway
Ring roads in Canada
Bypasses